The rufous-tailed tailorbird (Orthotomus sericeus) is a species of bird formerly placed in the "Old World warbler" assemblage, it but now placed in the family Cisticolidae.
It is found in Brunei, Indonesia, Malaysia, Myanmar, the Philippines, Singapore, and Thailand.
Its natural habitats are subtropical or tropical moist lowland forest and subtropical or tropical mangrove forest.

References

rufous-tailed tailorbird
Birds of Malesia
rufous-tailed tailorbird
Taxonomy articles created by Polbot